Cambridge Spies is a four-part British drama miniseries written by Peter Moffat and directed by Tim Fywell, that was first broadcast on BBC Two in May 2003 and is based on the true story of four brilliant young men at the University of Cambridge who are recruited to spy for the Soviet Union in 1934.

Plot
The series is set from 1934 to 1951 and follows the lives of the best-known quartet of the Cambridge Five Soviet spies, Guy Burgess, Kim Philby, Anthony Blunt and Donald Maclean, who whilst studying at the University of Cambridge are courted by Soviet agents and recruited into a world of covert intelligence and espionage. Fueled by youthful idealism, a passion for social justice, a talent for lying and a hatred for fascism, the four take huge personal risks to pass Britain's biggest secrets to Moscow. Across almost twenty years of spying and treachery, the four are bound by their beliefs, the secrets they know about one another, and the knowledge that they stand or fall together.

Cast

Production
Cambridge Spies was commissioned by Jane Tranter, BBC Controller of Drama Commissioning and production was announced on Cambridge Spies in August 2003. The BBC announced that it wanted the audience to be able to sympathise with the spies, whom it would portray as "incredibly glamorous". A BBC spokeswoman said it would be a "fresh" take on the story, and that it was the first time the story of the group as a whole had ever been tackled by film-makers.

Filming
Filming for Cambridge Spies began in September 2003 at locations in England and Spain. Filming took place at the University of Cambridge, where four days into filming a truck loaded with prop bicycles was stolen from outside a Cambridge hotel and emptied of its contents.

Various locations in London were used, such as One Great George Street, St. James's Park, Regent's Park, Hyde Park, Ham House; and Highgate Cemetery.

Locations in Spain were used as well with scenes set in Vienna, Austria, being filmed in Barcelona and scenes depicting the 1937 bombing of Guernica were filmed in Madrid.

Episodes

Reception

Ratings
Viewing figures for the series averaged at 2 million per episode.

Critical reception
Mark Lawson from The Guardian said “Cambridge Spies is high-class drama, but historically it's best regarded as a cover story”.

Appearing on Newsnight, Will Self, of the Evening Standard said “I think the historical inaccuracy is unforgivable. These are recent events. The real story is exciting and incredibly revealing of the nature of the British establishment at the time and on an enduring level. The historical liberties that have been taken, kick off from the start".

Awards and nominations

Home Media
The complete series was released on DVD on 2 June 2003.

References

External links
 
 
 The Cambridge Spies by Phillip Knightley at BBC History
 The Cambridge Spies at BBC History
 BBC tackles 'glamorous' spies at BBC News
 Cambridge spies were 'flawed' at BBC News
 Cambridge Spies: Your views at BBC News

2003 British television series debuts
2003 British television series endings
2000s British drama television series
2000s British LGBT-related drama television series
2000s British television miniseries
BBC television dramas
BBC television miniseries
Bletchley Park
British historical television series
Central Intelligence Agency in fiction‎ ‎
Cultural depictions of British men
Cultural depictions of the British Royal Family
Cultural depictions of the Cambridge Five
Cultural depictions of Charles III
Cultural depictions of Elizabeth II
Cultural depictions of Francisco Franco
Cultural depictions of George VI
English-language television shows
Espionage television series
Gay-related television shows
KGB in fiction
MI5 in fiction
Secret Intelligence Service in fiction
Television series about the Cold War
Television series based on actual events
Television series set in 1937
Television series set in 1940
Television series set in 1941
Television series set in 1944
Television series set in 1948
Television shows filmed in England
Television shows filmed in Spain
Television shows set in Austria
Television shows set in Barcelona
Television shows set in Cambridgeshire
Television shows set in England
Television shows set in France
Television shows set in Germany
Television shows set in London
Television shows set in New York City
Television shows set in Paris
Television shows set in Seville
Television shows set in Spain
Television shows set in the United States
Television shows set in Vienna
Television shows set in Washington, D.C.
Television shows shot in London
University of Cambridge in fiction
World War II television drama series